The Cate Brothers are an American singer-songwriter-musician duo of twin brothers from Fayetteville, Arkansas, Earl and Ernest "Ernie" Cate (born December 26, 1942). In the mid-1960s, they became performers of country soul music at clubs and dances in Arkansas and elsewhere in the mid-South of the United States. Both brothers are singers, with Earl playing guitar and Ernie playing piano. They were recording artists during the mid- to late-1970s and again from the mid-1990s through the first decade of the 2000s.

In their hometown of Fayetteville in the 1950s, where rock-and-roll pioneer Ronnie Hawkins had also grown up during the 1940s, Hawkins owned and operated the Rockwood Club. Other early rock musicians came to play there, including Jerry Lee Lewis, Carl Perkins, Roy Orbison and Conway Twitty. During the late 1950s the Cate brothers associated with Hawkins and his band, the Hawks, including drummer Levon Helm. In 1958, Hawkins and his band left Arkansas and settled in Canada. Later the Hawks went on to form the Band.
In the early 1970s, the duo began recording as The Cates Gang, releasing two albums on Metromedia Records.

In 1975, Helm introduced the Cate brothers to a record company representative in Los Angeles. The brothers soon after received a recording contract with Asylum Records and began releasing albums as The Cate Bros.

Their self-titled debut album released in 1975 was produced by guitarist Steve Cropper. He also performed on the record along with Levon Helm. Bass duties were carried out by Scott Edwards, Klaus Voormann, Bob Glaub, and Leland Sklar. The album contained the duo's only Top 40 single, "Union Man", which spent 20 weeks on the Billboard Hot 100, peaking at number 24 in May 1976.

Two more albums followed, In One Eye and out the Other in 1976 and Cate Bros. Band (with drummer Terry Cagle and bassist Ron Eoff) in 1977. Going forward, they would release albums under both names. In 1979, they reached a wider audience when they appeared on the PBS music television program Austin City Limits, taped in December 1978. In 1979, the brothers released their fourth and final album of the period, Fire on the Tracks, which reached number 24 on the rock album chart on the success of "Union Man". That single was one of the songs they had performed during the Austin City Limits television show, leading up to the album's release.

Although they only issued one recording through the 1980s, they remained a popular touring act around the southern country rock and blues circuit of the Tennessee and Arkansas region. 

Around 1980-1981 they frequently performed with Levon Helm, including an appearance on SCTV. On September 6, 1980, "Levon Helm & The Cate Brothers" opened a three act concert at the State Fairgrounds in Lewiston, ME. They were followed by Roy Buchanan and the headliner, The Grateful Dead. Tickets were $12.

In 1983-1984, the entire Cate Bros. Band joined Levon Helm, Rick Danko, Richard Manuel, and Garth Hudson in a revival of the Band. 

The group also worked with singer Maria Muldaur.

The Cate brothers resumed recording in the mid-1990s, releasing five albums on independent labels from 1995 to 2009. Their 1995 release, Radioland, featured blues guitarist Coco Montoya, formerly with the 1980s reformed version of John Mayall & the Bluesbreakers.

Porky Hill, the drummer for the Cate Brothers Band for 12 years, died in September 2000. Ron Eoff's brother Mickey then joined the band.

Discography
 Cate Bros. (Asylum, 1975) (AUS #96)
 In One Eye and Out the Other (Asylum, 1976)
 Cate Bros. Band (Asylum, 1977)
 Fire on the Tracks (Atlantic, 1979)
 Crisp 'N Tasty (Accord, 1983)
 Radioland (Icehouse, 1995)
 Struck a Vein (Big Burger, 1997)
 Arkansas Soul Siblings: The Crazy Cajun Recordings (Edsel, 1999) – recorded early/mid 1970s
 Live (Current, 1999)
 Play by the Rules (Louisiana Red Hot, 2004)
  In The Natural State with Jimmy Thackery (Rykodisc, 2006)
 Born to Wander: The Crazy Cajun Recordings (Broadside, 2009) - remastered reissue of Arkansas Soul Siblings The Malibu Sessions EP (Swingin' Door Records, 2014) - recorded 1982

Personnel

As The Cates Gang:
 Ernie Cate - Vocals, Keyboards
 Earl Cate - Guitar, Backing Vocals
 Terry Cagle - Drums, Percussion
 Billy Wright - Bass

As Cate Bros. Band'':
 Ernie Cate - Vocals, Keyboards
 Earl Cate - Guitar, Backing Vocals
 Terry Cagle - Drums, Percussion, Lead & Backing vocals (Died 2022)
 William "Porky" Hill - Drums (died 2000)
 Micky Eoff - Drums 
 Ron Eoff - Bass
 John Davies - Bass 
 David Renko - Saxophone

References

External links

American soul musical groups
Musical groups from Arkansas
People from Fayetteville, Arkansas
Identical twins
The Band
Twin musical duos
American musical duos